is a Japanese magical girl anime television series produced by White Fox. It was announced in July 2016 as White Fox's first original anime series that aired between October 4 and December 27, 2016.

Plot
Matoi Sumeragi, a second-year junior high school student, works part-time as a shrine maiden at Tenman Shrine in the city of Kamaya. Her close friend Yuma Kusanagi is part of the family of the shrine's chief priest, and is a candidate to be the successor shrine maiden. One day, Matoi and Yuma walk from the school to the shrine as usual, but when they arrive, they are greeted by the shrine's now damaged grounds, and Yuma's parents have both collapsed from their wounds. Matoi's father Shingo, a police detective, launches an investigation, and he comes upon a man who does not seem entirely sane, his only witness. When he holds down the man, Yuma begins the ritual of Divine Possession. Something strange then happens, not with Yuma, but with Matoi. Matoi Sumeragi, who had only wanted a normal, peaceful life, takes the role of a god, and gains the power to banish evil spirits.

Characters

Matoi is a 14-year old second year junior high school student that works part-time at Tenman Shrine as a shrine maiden. Matoi's mother went missing and she lived with her grandparents. She currently lives with her father, Shingo.

Yuma is a 13-year old first-year junior high school student, and the candidate for the next shrine maiden of Tenman Shrine. Yuma is a innocent and energetic girl.

Clarus is a 15-year old member of Fatima, the Vatican's secret Anti-Creed service.

Shingo is Matoi's father and a police officer. Matoi calls him by his first name, because they've only recently gotten to know each other.

Shiori is Matoi's mother who went missing several years prior to the start of the story.

Luciela is an IATO special agent investigating the demonic "Nights".

Cariot is a member of Fatima and is often seen with Clarus.

Nicknamed "Pochi", Hideo is Shingo's partner.

Flors is Clarus' previous partner. She was incapacitated by the monstrous Night called "Creed Killer".

Media

Anime
The original series is produced by White Fox, directed by Masayuki Sakoi and written by Yōsuke Kuroda, featuring character designs by Mai Toda and music by Tatsuya Kato. The opening theme is Chōmusubi Amulet (蝶結びアミュレット,Chōmusubi amyuretto, "Butterfly Knot Amulet") by Mia Regina. The voice actress unit Sphere, made up of Minako Kotobuki, Ayahi Takagaki, Haruka Tomatsu, and Aki Toyosaki, performs the anime's ending theme song, "My Only Place". The anime series had a stage event at the Kyoto International Manga and Anime Fair 2016 on September 17, 2016. Sentai Filmworks has licensed the anime in North America and it was streamed on the Hulu and Anime Network. Madman Entertainment was streaming the series on AnimeLab. MVM Films will release the series in the United Kingdom.

Episode list

Notes

References

External links

Magical girl anime and manga
Television shows about exorcism
Fiction set in 2016
Anime with original screenplays
White Fox
Sentai Filmworks
Shinto in fiction
Television shows written by Yōsuke Kuroda
Tokyo MX original programming